Macrarene cookeana, common name Miss Cooke's liotia, is a species of sea snail, a marine gastropod mollusk in the family Liotiidae.

Description
The length of the shell varies between 18 mm and 30 mm.

Distribution
This species occurs in the Pacific Ocean off Baja California, Mexico.

References
Notes

Sources
 Abbott R. T. (1974). American Seashells. The marine mollusca of the Atlantic and Pacific coast of North America. II edit. Van Nostrand, New York 663 p. + 24 pl: 
page(s): 53

External links
 To Biodiversity Heritage Library (1 publication)
 To Encyclopedia of Life
 To USNM Invertebrate Zoology Mollusca Collection
 To ITIS
 To World Register of Marine Species
 

Liotiidae
Gastropods described in 1918